The 1924 Frankford Yellow Jackets season was their inaugural season in the National Football League. The team finished 11–2–1 in league play and 17–3–1 overall, enough to finish in third in the league.

Schedule

Standings

References

Frankford Yellow Jackets seasons
Frankford Yellow Jackets